Elipsos Internacional S.A. was a Spanish company which was set up in 2001 by Spanish RENFE and French SNCF with a 50% share each. It was created to handle the logistics of Trenhotel night railway services between Spain and France, Switzerland and Italy; in 2013 only services to France remained; they were cut back to thrice a week in September 2013, and discontinued on 15 December as the high speed line between France and Spain had opened. The Elipsos Trenhotel operated with Talgo gauge change trains. 

Between December 2013 and December 2022, Elipsos handled high-speed trains between France and Spain, sold as "Renfe-SNCF in Cooperation".

Services
Trains managed by Elipsos:
 Paris Gare de Lyon - Barcelona (operated by SNCF TGV)
 Lyon Part-Dieu - Barcelona (operated by Renfe AVE)
 Toulouse - Barcelona (operated by Renfe AVE)
 Marseille - Madrid (operated by Renfe AVE)

Former trains:

 Francisco de Goya (Madrid Chamartin-Paris Austerlitz) (ended December 2013)
 Joan Miró (Barcelona Estació de França-Paris Austerlitz) (ended December 2013)
 Pau Casals (Barcelona Estació de França -Zürich Hauptbahnhof) (ended 7 December 2012)
 Salvador Dalí (Barcelona Estació de França -Milano Centrale) (ended 7 December 2012)

The Elipsos bed carriages were operated by Compagnie Internationale des Wagons-Lits and by the different national railway companies. In France the train was pulled by an SNCF locomotive, in Spain by a RENFE one, in Italy by a Trenitalia one and in Switzerland by a SBB CFF FFS one.

The Francisco de Goya departed Paris every night except Saturday at 19:45 during the summer months and less frequently during the winter. As of September 2013 it only ran from Madrid only on Thursdays, Fridays and Sundays, with the return services from Paris on Fridays, Sundays, and Mondays.

The 'Joan Miró departed Paris every night at 20:34 and arrived Barcelona at 08:24. In all these trains customers could take dinner and breakfast in the dining car. As of September 2013, it only ran from Barcelona only on Thursdays, Fridays and Sundays, with the return services from Paris on Fridays, Sundays, and Mondays.
 
The trains generally had these classes:
 Reclining seat
 Tourist Class (4-bed accommodation)
 Club Class (1- or 2-bed accommodation with breakfast included)
 Grand Class (1- or 2-bed accommodation with shower/WC, dinner and breakfast included)

References

External links
 Company website

Railway companies established in 2001
Railway companies of France
Railway companies of Spain